CRTC may refer to:

Canadian Radio-television and Telecommunications Commission, a regulatory agency for broadcasting and telecommunications
Canadian Reconnaissance Training Centre at CFAD Dundurn, in Dundurn, Saskatchewan, Canada
Center for Research, Testing, and Consultancy at the Shahjalal University of Science and Technology
Citizens Regional Transit Corporation, transit organization in the Buffalo-area, New York, USA
Cold Regions Test Center at Fort Greely, Alaska, USA
Combat Readiness Training Center:
Gulfport Combat Readiness Training Center, Gulfport, Mississippi, USA
Savannah Combat Readiness Training Center of the Georgia Air National Guard, in Savannah, Georgia, USA
Volk Field Air National Guard Base, Wisconsin, USA
Combat Replacement Training Center at Lae Nadzab Airport in Lae, Papua New Guinea
Video Display Controller, also referred to as a Cathode Ray Tube Controller
Motorola 6845, also known as the 6845 CRTC or CRTC6845, a video display controller
: an abstraction in the Linux kernel for hardware CRTCs

See also
Carotenoid 1,2-hydratase, also known as CrtC
CREB regulated transcription coactivator (disambiguation)
CTRC (disambiguation)